Donald Shaw Mackinnon Macdonald (born 25 September 1951) was a Scottish international rugby union player.

He was capped for  seven times between 1977 and 1978. He also played for Oxford University RFC, London Scottish FC, and West of Scotland FC.

His older brother Dugald MacDonald was also capped for  against the 1974 British Lions tour to South Africa.

References
Bath, Richard (ed.) The Scotland Rugby Miscellany (Vision Sports Publishing Ltd, 2007 )

1951 births
Living people
London Scottish F.C. players
Scottish rugby union players
Scotland international rugby union players
West of Scotland FC players
Oxford University RFC players